Christophe Massina (born 11 January 1974) is a French judoka.

Achievements

References

External links
 
 

1974 births
Living people
French male judoka
Universiade medalists in judo
Mediterranean Games gold medalists for France
Mediterranean Games medalists in judo
Competitors at the 2001 Mediterranean Games
Universiade bronze medalists for France
Medalists at the 1995 Summer Universiade
21st-century French people